Selim Ben Djemia (born 29 January 1989) is a professional footballer who plays for Spanish club CD Don Benito as a defender. Born in France, he represented Tunisia at international level.

Club career
In 2007, Ben Djemia joined Italian side Genoa at the age of 18. On 23 June 2010, Serie B club Padova decided not to buy him outright; on the next day, he went to Frosinone on loan with option to co-own the player as part of Robert Gucher's deal.

On 8 February 2017, Ben Djemia signed with Bulgarian club Vereya.

On 10 February 2018, in the last day before the end of the transfer window for unattached players, Ben Djemia signed with Greek Superleague club Lamia, on a 6-month deal.

International career
Ben Djemia was named in Tunisia's international squad for their friendly match against South Korea on 28 May 2014, where he made his international debut in a 1–0 win.

References

External links
 
 
 

1989 births
Living people
People from Thiais
French sportspeople of Tunisian descent
Citizens of Tunisia through descent
French footballers
Association football defenders
Serie B players
Genoa C.F.C. players
Calcio Padova players
Frosinone Calcio players
Ligue 2 players
Championnat National players
Championnat National 3 players
Red Star F.C. players
Stade Lavallois players
Liga I players
FC Petrolul Ploiești players
FC Astra Giurgiu players
FC Dunărea Călărași players
Tunisian Ligue Professionnelle 1 players
CS Sfaxien players
First Professional Football League (Bulgaria) players
FC Vereya players
Super League Greece players
PAS Lamia 1964 players
Segunda División B players
CD Don Benito players
French expatriate footballers
Expatriate footballers in Italy
Expatriate footballers in Romania
Expatriate footballers in Tunisia
Expatriate footballers in Bulgaria
Expatriate footballers in Greece
Expatriate footballers in Spain
French expatriate sportspeople in Italy
French expatriate sportspeople in Romania
French expatriate sportspeople in Tunisia
French expatriate sportspeople in Bulgaria
French expatriate sportspeople in Greece
French expatriate sportspeople in Spain
Tunisia international footballers
2015 Africa Cup of Nations players
Footballers from Val-de-Marne